Edward Osmund Royle Reynolds, CBE, FRCP, FRCOG, FRCPCH, FMedSci, FRS (born 3 February 1933, in Brighton - died 24 April 2017), was a British paediatrician and Neonatologist who was most notable for the introduction of new techniques intended to improve the survival of newborns, especially those with respiratory failure, and for a series of papers regarding the value of techniques such as ultrasound imaging, nuclear magnetic resonance spectroscopy, and near infrared spectroscopy in determining the development and response to injury of the infant brain after birth.

Life
Edmunds was the son of Edward Reynolds, a solicitor, and his wife, Edna (née Jones). He was educated at St Paul's School, London, then qualified at St Thomas' Hospital in 1958, interrupting his course to study science with Henry Barcroft and Maureen Young.

Reynolds was a world championship fencer, winning a bronze in the team event in the 1955 World Fencing Championships.

Career
In 1962, Reynolds travelled to the United States as a research fellow with Dav Cook visiting both the Boston Children's Hospital and Harvard Medical School. While there, they researched hyaline membrane disease. After a quick visit to 
Yale School of Medicine, Reynolds returned to the UK in 1964, taking an appointment at the Department of Paediatrics at University College Hospital in London, working under Professor Leonard B. Strang and to help him establish a unit to study the fetal and neonatal lung. This collaboration led to team which produced a series of remarkable reports on pathophysiology.

Starting in 1976, Reynolds was appointed to the Chair in Neonatal Paediatrics at the University of London, becoming Emeritus in 1996. He was also Head of the Department of Paediatrics at University College London and the Middlesex School of Medicine from 1987 to 1992.

He also served as president of the Neonatal Society.

Contribututions
Reynolds was one of the first pioneers in imagining to appraise brain injury in children suffering from Hypoxia. He researched the condition in both piglets and lambs, and this research led to formation of a team, that was able to build a device that captured the first human phosphorus nuclear magnetic resonance spectroscopy. This led to Reynolds most important discovery, that brain cells didn't die after injury, but instead there was a period where the physician could intervene to repair the injury. This research led to the discovery of therapeutic hypothermia, that cooled the brain to reduce damage, a treatment that is standard for babies with brain damage.

Awards and honours
His awards include the

 James Spence Medal,  
 Dawson-Williams Memorial Prize, 
 Harding Award
 Maternité Prize.

He was elected a Fellow of the Royal Society in 1993. Reynolds was appointed a CBE in 1995 and elected a Fellow of the Academy of Medical Sciences in 1998.

Bibliography
From 1978 to 1992 he was Specialist Adviser to a House of Commons Health Select Committee and its predecessors, contributing to four reports:

 
 
 
 

The following papers were his most important.

References

External links 
 

1933 births
Place of birth missing
2017 deaths
Place of death missing
British paediatricians
People educated at St Paul's School, London
People from Brighton
Commanders of the Order of the British Empire
Officers of the Order of the British Empire
Fellows of the Royal Society
Fellows of the Royal College of Physicians
Fellows of the Royal College of Obstetricians and Gynaecologists
Fellows of the Royal College of Paediatrics and Child Health
Fellows of the Academy of Medical Sciences (United Kingdom)
Recipients of the James Spence Medal